A trading post, trading station, or trading house, also known as a factory, is an establishment or settlement where goods and services could be traded.

Typically the location of the trading post would allow people from one geographic area to trade in goods produced in another area. In some examples, local inhabitants could use a trading post to exchange local products for goods they wished to acquire.

Examples
Major towns in the Hanseatic League were known as kontors, a form of trading posts.

Charax Spasinu was a trading post between the Roman and Parthian Empires.

Manhattan and Singapore were both established as trading posts, by Dutchman Peter Minuit and Englishman Stamford Raffles respectively, and later developed into major settlements.

Other uses
 In the context of scouting, trading post usually refers to a camp store in which snacks, craft materials, and general merchandise are sold. "Trading posts" also refers to a cub scout actitivty in which cub teams (or individuals) undertake challenge activities in exchange for points.
 A "trading post" also once referred to a trading booth within the New York Stock Exchange.

See also
 Entrepôt
 Factory (trading post)
 Fur trade
 Karum (trade post)
 Navajo trading posts
 Panton, Leslie & Company
 Trading Post (newspaper)
 United States Government Fur Trade Factory System

References

External links